Colostethus imbricolus is a species of frog in the family Dendrobatidae. It is endemic to Colombia. Its natural habitats are subtropical or tropical moist lowland forests and rivers. It is threatened by habitat loss. The biomes of the frog are Terrestrial and Freshwater.

References

 http://amphibiaweb.org/cgi-bin/amphib_query?query_src=aw_lists_genera_&table=amphib&where-genus=Colostethus&where-species=imbricolus

Colostethus
Amphibians of Colombia
Amphibians described in 1975
Taxonomy articles created by Polbot